Eresina katera is a butterfly in the family Lycaenidae. It is found in Uganda (the western shores of Lake Victoria) and north-western Tanzania. Its habitat consists of dense, primary forests.

References

Butterflies described in 1962
Poritiinae